List of villages of Darbhanga refers to villages in Darbhanga district in Bihar.

The following villages are located in Darbhanga district in respective blocks:

Darbhanga

Asraha
Adalpur
Amdiha
Ami
Andhri
Arazi Barmotar
Atihar
Az Rakbe Ami
Az Rakbe Purkhotimpur
Badea
Badh Marauna
Balaha
Balia
Banauli
Bansdih
Basaila
Basdeopur
Bedaul
Behat
Bela
Bela Dullah
Bela Dullah
Bela Nawada
Bela Shankar
Belhar
Belwa
Bhagwanpur
Bhalpatti
Bhaluahi
Bhawanipur
Bhidhi
Bhindi
Bhuskaul
Bijuli
Bishunpur
Bishunpur Medni
Borwa
Brahmotar Az Rakbe Dularpur
Bramotar Az Rakbe Chhatwan
Chak Abdul Rahim
Chak Bhulka
Chak Gadhia
Chak Jamal
Chak Karima
Chak Mohiuddin
Chak Sona
Chak Wali
Chakka
Chamru Bishunpur
Chandpatti
Chataria
Chhabila
Chhoataipatti
Chikni
Darbhanga (M Corp.)
Dharampur (Singhwara 847306)
Dhoi
Dih Berai
Diwari
Dularpur
Dumduma
Dumri
Fazla
Gabir Chak
Gairpur
Gangwara
Gausa
Gausa Dih
Gehumi
Gehumi
Gehumi
Ghorghata
Harpur
Harpur
Jafra
Kabaria
Kabir Chak
Kansi (Part in Bahadurpur)
Kansi Dakhli
Kanti
Karhatia
Ketuka
Khajuri
Kharthua
Kharua
Kheraj Bela
Khodadadpur
Khojkipur
Khutwara
Lau Tola
Leama
Mabbi Belauna
Madhopur
Madhpur
Mahjidia
Mankauli
Mahua
Majhiam
Majlis Pokhar
Makhnahi
Malpatti
Mamal
Mani
Manihas
Manihas Kansi
Masumpur Kataria
Mathurapur
Mausimpur
Milki
Muria
Mustafapur
Naina Ghat
Narkatia
Narkatia
Pachgachhia
Padri (CT)
Panta
Pathar Patti
Pura
pouram
Purkhotimpur
Ram Berai
Rampur Madan
Rampur
Rampur Kasim 1
Rampur Kasim 2
Ramsala
Ranipur
Ranna
Rasula
Rasulpur Sahila
Ruchaul
Sara Fazil
Sara Mahamad
Shahzadpur
Shahbazpur Bhulka
Shahzadpur
Siso
Sobhan
Sonki
Sundarpur
Tektar
Tethan
Thakurania
Hanumangar Panu Tolla

Baheri 

Adharpur
Amta
Athar
Baghauni
Baghra
Baheri
Bakmandar
Baligaon
Bandh Jhanjhar
Bandhuli
Behrauna
Benta
Bhachhi Asli
Bhagawatipur
Bharwari
Bhawani Nimaithi
Bithauli
Chak Raipur
Chaka
Chakla
Chakwa
Chilha Asli
Dadarwara
Dhanauli
Dhobepur Bansara
Dilawarpur
Dohat Narain
Dubauli
Dumri
Gangdah
Gujraul
Hathauri
Inay
Jadupatti
Jurja
Kalyanpur
Kapi
Kargawan
Kerwakoith
Khagrahata
Khagri
Kharari
Kumar
Kushiam
Lagupur
Madhuban
Mattharahi
Maheshpur
Mahua
Mankopatti
Mataunia
Naradapatti
Nimaithi
Paghari
Partapatti
Ramauli
Rajwara
Rampur
Sadhua
Salha
Samadhpura
Samastipur
Sankhara
Semram
Semri
Serwamanor
Sher
Sonwan
Sosari
Thathupur
Turki

Biraul 

Afzala
Akbarpur Baik
Andhiari
Arjuna Bijulia
Athar
Auranga Usuri
Awan
Az Rakbe Gobindpur
Balia
Belgaun
Bhaini
Bhanta
Birampur
Biraul
Bhawanipur
Changwara
Deokali
Dumri
Fakirana
Gambhiria
Gaura
Gayri
Hanshi
Hanti
Harpatti Gobindpur
Harpur Kalan
Jagarnathpur
Jagdispur
Jaikishunpur
Kahuwa
Kamlabari
Kamar Kalan
Kataya
Ladha
Lalpur
Mahamadpur Boaanri
Mahua
Manorbhoram
Mirzapur
Murwara
Naraenpur
Nausta
Neuri
Padri
Paghari
Pakhram
Parhat
Patania
Ramnagar
Rampur
Rasulpur
Rohar
Saduka
Sahasram
Saho
Shiunagar
Shiwpur
Sihol
Sirsia
Sogaha
Sonbihat
Sonpur

Supaul
Talibpur
Uchhati

Keoti Ranway 

Andama
Asrafpur
Asraha
Badh Samaila
Bansara
Banwari Patti
Barahi
Barahi Abuara 
Bariaul
Bazidpur
Behta
Bhagwatpur
Bharathpur
Bheriahi
Bhojpatti
Bihatwara
Binwara
Birkha
Birkhauli
Birna
Bishunpur 
Chak Ajam
Chak Bhawani
Chakka
Chamarjana urf Dudhia
Chatra
Chhachha
Chhatwan
Dalwa
Darma
Dhobgawan
Dhuria
Dhuria Daharia
Dighiar
Dome
Gobindpur
Gokhul
Hajipur
Hanuman Nagar
Harpur
Jalwara
Jethiahi
Jiwra
Kaem Chak
Kaharia
Kamaldah
Karjapatti
Kasma Balbhadar
Keoti Ranway
Kheraj Dhuria
Kheraj Mardan Singh
Khirma
Kishunpur
Koilathan
Kopgarh
Kothia
Kothli Majhiama
Ladari
Lahwar
Lalganj 
Madhopatti Raghauli
Mahamadpur
Maheshajan
Mangarthu
Megha
Milki
Mohan Math
Mohanpur
Naya Gaon
Nonaura
Pacharhi
Pachma
Paighambarpur
Para
Pathra
Pilakhwar
Pindaruch
Radha
Raiam
Rajaura
Ranway
Rasulpur
Ratauli
Sahpur Dih
Samaila
Sarhwara
Sarjapur
Shekhpatti
Shekhpura urf Dagarwara
Tektar
Postapur
Dudhya Hanumannagar

Singhwara

Arai
Asthua
Atarbel
Atarbel Ramchaura
Baheri
Bahuara Buzurg
Balaha
Banauli
Barhaulia
Basauli
Bastwara
Bataul
Bedauli
Bhagwatipur
Bhajaura Nankar
Bharathi
Bharauli
Bharwara
Bhawanipur
Birdipur
Bisambharpur
Bisaul
Bishunathpatti
Bithauli
Brahampur
Chak Dargah
Chak Kazi
Chaphan
Dahsil
Fatehpur
Gaura
Gobindpur
Gogaul urf Gangauli
Hajipur
Hanuman Nagar
Harakh
Hariharpur
Harpur
Hasan Chak
Hayatpur
Inamat
Kalwara
Kanigaon
Kathalia
Katka
Kauar
Kawai
Kewatsa
Kheraj Phulthua
Kora
Korauni
Kuarpatti
Kusumpatti
Kusumpatti Kanaur
Lorika
Madhopur
Madhupur
Maheshpatti
Maheshpatti
Makanpur
Manihas
Manikauli
Mirzapur Jagni
Mirzapur Jitwara
Misrauli
Mohanpur
Nista
Paigambarpur
Paira
Phulthua
Pipra
Rajo
Rampatti
Rampura
Rasulpur
Sabaul
Sanahpur Buzurg
Sanahpur Dih
Saraia
Sarwara
Shakarpur
Simri
Singhwara
Sirhauli
Tekatar

Jale 

Ahiari
Badri
Bihari
Baghaul
Bandhauli
Barhampur
Chak Milki
Chak Talaila
Chandar Dipa
Chandauna
Darhia
Deora
Dighopatti
Dighra
Gadari
Gaisri
Ghograha
Harauli
Jale
Jogiara
Kachhua
Kaji Bahera
Kalwara
Kamtaul
Kangni
Kardahuli
Karhans Ratanpur
Karwa
Katai
Kataia
Katraul
Katraul Basant
Khajurwara
Kheraj
Lalpur
Mahuli Nankar
Majhaura
Malikpur
Manam Deb
Manamkhedu
Massa
Milk Pauni
Muraitha
Nagar Diha
Nawada
Nimrauli
Pakhauli
Pauni
Rajaun
Rajaun Asli
Rarhi
Ratanpur Abhiman
Ratanpur Mokari
Reorha
Rumaul
Sadrabad
Sahaspur
Sisauni Rajaun
Tariyani

Bahadurpur 

Abdullahpur
Ahiapatti
Ahila
Ahmad Sujawal
Amapatti
Andama
Asgaon
Az Rakbe Basdeopur
Badh Basti
Balaha
Balbhadarpur
Bali Bagraul
Balia
Ballupur
Baluahi
Bankipur
Baraur
Barheta
Baruara
Basatpur
Basdeopur
Bastauli
Bazidpur
Bedipatti
Bela Yakub
Bhairopatti
Bhatani
Birnia
Bishambharpur
Bishunpur Manora
Biuni
Chak Aga
Chak Gonauli
Chak Mahnauli
Chak Maksudpur
Chakka
Chataria
Dih Chhaprar
Chintamanpur
Dagarsam 
Dalaur
Darhar
Dasrathpatti
Dekuli
Deokali
Dharnipatti
Dilawarpur
Ekmi
Fatehpur
Gangapatti
Gangia
Ganipur
Gehumi
Gharghata
Ghorghata
Gobindpur
Gopipatti
Gorhia
Gundauli
Harpatti
Hasanpur
Hem Naraenpur
Jagdispur
Jalwara
Jiwanpatti
Jogiara
Kamrauli
Kansi
Kapchhahi
Khaira Kunji
Kheraj Shahpur
Kherajpur
Kishunpur
Kokat
Kusothar
Lachhmipur
Madhuban
Mahpara
Mahua
Maniari
Mathia urf Madhopur
Mekna Baida
Mirzapur
Musapur
Nehalpur
Ojhaul
Padri
Pansiha
Parauna
Phakila
Pingi
Pirari
Pokhar Bhinda
Premjiwar
Purkhopatti
Raghaipura
Raja Rauli
Rambhadarpur
Ramnagar
Rampur Dakhli
Rampur Madan
Rampur Ramdeo aka Chandih
Rampur Rauli
Rasulpur Kalan
Rasulpur Khurd
Rosan Chak
Salaha
Semra
Senduar Gopal
Shahpur
Shankarpur
Siram Pipra
Sirdilpur
Sobhan
Tara Lahi
Tarauni
Teunga
Ughara
Yakubpur

Benipur block 

Achalpur
Amaithi
Az Rakbe Mahinam
Baigani
Balni
Barhampatti
Batho
Bikupatti
Bishunathpur
Deoram
Dherukh
Ganesh Banau 
Hari Bhauor
Harpur
Itaharwa
Jakauli
Jarshon
Katwara
Khamhan
Kishunpur
Labani
Lachhmanpur
Madhopur
Mahinam
Moazampur
Mokarampur
Nawada
Panchupatti
Parkhotimpur
Pohadi
Ramouli
Rarhiam
Rasulpur
Sajhwar
Shivram
Sherampur
Sirampur
Supaul
Tarauni
Upardaha
Ghongheya

Manigachhi 

Amtahi
Aropur
Az Rakbe Kotma
Badhipur
Baghant
Bahuarwa
Barhampur
Barhampura
Bazidpur
Belahi
Belaur
Bhandarso
Bhatpura
Bihta
Bisaul
Chak Basawan
Chak Chintamanpur
Chandaur
Dahura
Dubhaul
Gangauli
Jagdishpur
Jatuka
Kaesth Kawai
Kanakpur
Kanhauli
Kotma
Lehara
Madhepur
Maunbehat
Mir Chak
Narotimpur
Paik Tola
Paithan Kawai
Pandaul
Phulban
Raghopur
Raje
Sukhwara
Tariati
Tatuar
Ujan
Makaranda
 Nazra Babu Tola

Kashimpur
Aber urf Rambari
Asman
Aso
Atraha
Aurahi
Bahrampur urf Masankhon
Bairo
Balaha
Bargaon
Barhampur
Barna
Barsanda
Basaul
Ber
Bhadahar
Bhatwan
Bisharia
Chingri
Darbepur
Dharshyam
Dinmo
Dubaha
Fakirana Kalyan Dih
Geaspur
Ghordaur
Ghorsar
Gora
Gothani
Harauli
Harinagar
Hathauri
Hathra
Hirni
Jafarpur
Jhajhra
Kachhua
Kalna Dih
Khesraha
Khotas Kalana
Ladiami
Laranch Bhadaul
Larni
Lodipur
Maharajpur
Mahri
Mahri Dih
Maibi
Majhiam
Manaitha
Manoripur
Missi
Mohim Buzurg
Mohim Khurd
Naraenpur
Pach Hara Buzrug
Pachhara Khurd
Paika Charai
Pakahi
Pando
Pirori
Sanauli
Sanauli
Sanichara
Semraha
Shahpur
Siripur urf Sukmarpur
Sultanpur
Tasmanpatti
Tole Khaki Daspur
Uda

Hanumannagar 

Ama Dih
Araila
Baghela
Bahupatti
Banswara
Barhmotara
Basant
Bharaul
Bhawanipur
Bihari Makund
Bisaul
Bishunpur
Chandauli
Chhatauna
Dabhrauli
Dath
Dih lahi
Godaipatti
Gopalpur
Gorhaila
Gorhiari
Gorwara
Gorwara Barhmotar
Hasanpur
Hichhaul
Husenabad
Jamalpur urf Santpur
Kali
Khusro Sarae
Kolhatta
Lauara
Madhopur
Mahamadpur
Mahamadpur Sinduar
Mahnauli
Manhara
Moro
Mustafapur
Narsara
Neam
Panchobh
Pandaul
Patori
Phulwaria
Poaria
Rajwara
Rampatti
Rampur
Rampur Dih
Ratanpura
Rupauli
Saidpur
Thalwara
Tisi Dih
Uchauli
Udhopatti
Ughra
Urra

Gaura Bauram 

Aadharpur
Adhlar
Adhlar
Ahisa
Akhtwara
Asi
Baijnathpur
Balthari
Bangrahata
Bangrasi
Bargawan
Basuli
Bath
Bauram
Belwara
Bhuskan
Bishunpur
Ganauni
Gauramansingh
Hasanpur
Hasopur
Kahuwa
Kanhai
Kasraund
Kothram
Kumai (village)
Kunauni
Lagwa Bais
Magura
Mahuwar
Malhi
Mansara
Misrauli
Nadai
Nankar
Nari Bhadawn
Nasahara
Palawa
Parasrama
Pharshahi
Punach
Rauta
Tenduwa
Tira
Uphraul

Hayaghat 

Akbarpur
Aliabad
Anantpur
Anar
Anpatti Bishunpur
Balia
Bans Dih
Berai Patti
Bishunpur
Chandanpatti
Chikni
Debipur
Dhiropatti
Ghosrama
Hajipur
Hajipur Biranpatti
Hawasa
Horalpatti
Madhu Patti
Mahamadpur
Mahamadpur Sirnia
Majhaulia Bisaipatti
Makhanpur
Maksudpur
Maahipatti Bahadurpur
Mannupur Kharra
Manorathpur
Manorathpur Tulsi
Mirzapur
Parmanandpur
Parmar
Pator
Paurao
Pipraulia
Rasulpur
Ratanpura
Singhauli
Sirampur
Sirnia
Siwaisinghpur
Sobhai Patti
Sobhnath Patti
Usma

Alinagar 

Adhloam
Alinagar
Andauli

Antour
Askaul
Baghela
Chak Khoka
Chak Milki
Chamropatti
Dhamsayn
Dhamwara
Gadaul
Gorkha
Hanuman Nagar
Haritha
Harsinghpur
Jaitipur
Kataha
Kiratpur
Korthu
Kurson
Lahata
Lilpur
Milki
Mirzapur
Mohiuddipur
Motipur
Nankar
Narma
Nuruddinpur Dost
Pirauli
Rampur Udai
Rashidpur
Rupaspur
Shampur
Sisouni
Sohat
Tumaul
Urgawan

Ghanshyampur 

Asma
Bhagwanpur Bhit
Borwa
Burheb
Burheb Inaitpur
Chharapatti
Dathua
Dohatha
Dompathi
Faizullahpur
Ghanshyampur
Godhaul
Galma
Hardowarpur
Jadupatti
Korthu
Kumraul
Mahathwar
Padari
Pali
Phakirana
Pohadi
Punahad
Salahpur Lagma
Semadeori
Shahpur
Supaul
Tumaul

Kusheshwar Asthan Purbi 

Adalpur
Anrahi
Barania
Beltharwa
Bhaluka
Bhirua
Bishunia
Burhia Sukhrasi
Dharampur
Godaipura
Goram Dih
Gulma
Harnahi
Itahar
Kaunia
Kewatgawan
Khalasin
Kola
Kolatoka
Mahadeo Math
Mahisanr urf Narkatia
Mahisaut
Pipra
Piprahi
Raepur
Reota
Samhaura
Simartoka
Sisauna
Sughrain
Tilakpur
Tilkeswar
Ujua
Urthua
Usri

Tardih 

Awam
Baika
Barhmotar
Batha
Bathay
Bishunpur
Bisuhat
Chaka
Dadpatti
Deona
Dhanirampur
Dhankaul
Ejrahta
Kaithwar
Kathara
Khidarpura
Kakodha
Kurson
Lagma Rambhadar
Lodiami
Machhaita
Madaria
Mahia
Mahthor
Nadhiami
Naraenpur
Pachahi Machhaita
Patai
Phakirna
Phulwaria
Pokhar Bhinda
Raja Kharwar
Sakatraipur
Sherpur
Sirampur
Sotharia
Tangha
Tardi

Kiratpur 

Amahi
Bhobhaul
Bholi
Birdipur
Danha
Dhangha
Jagson
Jamalpur
Jhagarua
Kandwara
Khaisa
Kubaul
Narkatia
Rasiyari
Tarwara
Tatari

References

Darbhanga